Lowell Fulson (March 31, 1921March 7, 1999) was an American blues guitarist and songwriter, in the West Coast blues tradition. He also recorded for contractual reasons as Lowell Fullsom and Lowell Fulsom. After T-Bone Walker, he was the most important figure in West Coast blues in the 1940s and 1950s.

Early life
Fulson was born on a Choctaw reservation in Atoka, Oklahoma, to Mamie and Martin Fulson. He stated that he was of Cherokee ancestry through his father but also claimed Choctaw ancestry. His father was killed when Lowell was a child, and a few years later, he moved with his mother and brothers to live in Clarita and attended school at Coalgate.

Career
At the age of eighteen, he moved to Ada, Oklahoma, and joined Alger "Texas" Alexander for a few months in 1940, but later moved to California, where he formed a band which soon included a young Ray Charles and the tenor saxophone player Stanley Turrentine.  Fulson was drafted in 1943 and served in the U.S. Navy until 1945.

Fulson recorded for Swing Time Records in the 1940s, Chess Records (on the Checker label) in the 1950s, Kent Records in the 1960s, and Rounder Records (Bullseye) in the 1970s.  He wrote "3 O'Clock Blues" (B.B. King's first hit),  "Reconsider Baby" (a blues standard), and "Tramp" (co-written with Jimmy McCracklin and recorded by several artists).  His 1965 song "Black Nights" was his first hit in a decade, and "Tramp" did even better, restoring him to R&B stardom.

A show entitled California Blues: Swingtime Tribute opened in 1993 at the Paramount Theatre in Oakland, California, with Fulson, Johnny Otis, Charles Brown, Jay McShann, Jimmy Witherspoon, Jimmy McCracklin and Earl Brown. Fulson's last recording was a duet of "Every Day I Have the Blues" with Jimmy Rogers on the latter's 1999 Atlantic Records release, The Jimmy Rogers All-Stars: Blues, Blues, Blues.

Death
Fulson died in Long Beach, California, on March 7, 1999, at the age of 77. His companion, Tina Mayfield said that the causes of death were complications from kidney disease, diabetes, and congestive heart failure. He was the father of four and grandfather of thirteen. Fulson was interred in Inglewood Park Cemetery, in Inglewood, California.

Awards and recognition
 1993: Induction into the Blues Foundation Hall of Fame
 1993: Blues Foundation Hall of Fame, Classics of Blues Recording – Singles or Album Tracks, for "Reconsider Baby"
 1993: Blues Foundation Blues Music Award, Traditional Album of the Year, for Hold On
 1993: Rhythm and Blues Foundation, Pioneer Award
 1995: Grammy Awards, nomination as Best Traditional Blues Album of the Year, for Them Update Blues
 1995: Rock and Roll Hall of Fame, "Reconsider Baby" included in the "500 Songs That Shaped Rock and Roll"
 2010: Blues Foundation Hall of Fame, Classics of Blues Recording – Albums, for Hung Down Head

Partial discography

Charting singles

Selected albums

{|class="wikitable"
|-
! width="40" | Year
! width="450" | Title
! width="130" | Label
|-
| 1959
| Back Home Blues
| Night Train
|-
| 1962
| Lowell Fulson
| Arhoolie
|-
| 1966
| Soul
| rowspan="3" | Kent
|-
| 1967
| Tramp
|-
| rowspan="2" | 1969
| Now
|-
| In a Heavy Bag
| Jewel
|-
| 1970
| Hung Down Head
| Chess
|-
| 1971
| Let's Go Get Stoned
| Kent
|-
| 1973
| I've Got the Blues
| Jewel
|-
| rowspan="2" | 1975
| Lowell Fulson (Early Recordings)
| Arhoolie
|-
| Ol' Blues Singer
| Granite
|-
| 1976
| Lowell Fulson
| Chess
|-
| rowspan="2" | 1984
| Everyday I Have the Blues
| Night Train
|-
| One More Blues
| Black & Blue
|-
| rowspan="2" | 1988
| San Francisco Blues| Black Lion
|-
| It's a Good Day| Rounder
|-
| 1992
| Hold On| Bullseye Blues
|-
| rowspan="2" | 1995
| Sinner's Prayer| Night Train
|-
| Them Update Blues| Bullseye Blues
|-
| 1996
| Mean Old Lonesome Blues| Night Train
|-
| 1997
| The Complete Chess Masters (50th Anniversary Collection)| Chess
|-
| 2001
| I've Got the Blues (... and Then Some) (complete Jewel recordings)
| Westside UK
|-
| 2002
| The Complete Kent Recordings 1964–1968| P-Vine
|-
| 2004
| 1946–1953, Vols. 1–4 (complete Big Town, Downbeat/Swing Time recordings)
| JSP
|}
With John Lee HookerI Feel Good! (Carson, 1970)I Wanna Dance All Night'' (America, 1970)

References

External links 
 Encyclopedia of Oklahoma History and Culture - Fulson, Lowell

1921 births
1999 deaths
People from Atoka County, Oklahoma
African-American guitarists
American blues guitarists
American male guitarists
American blues singer-songwriters
Blues musicians from Oklahoma
Kent Records artists
Jewel Records artists
People from Ada, Oklahoma
Texas blues musicians
West Coast blues musicians
Soul-blues musicians
Checker Records artists
Burials at Inglewood Park Cemetery
20th-century American guitarists
Singer-songwriters from Texas
Singer-songwriters from Oklahoma
Guitarists from Oklahoma
Guitarists from Texas
Black & Blue Records artists
African-American male songwriters
20th-century African-American male singers
United States Navy personnel of World War II
Deaths from kidney failure
Deaths from diabetes
African Americans in World War II
African-American United States Navy personnel